The 1983 New York City Marathon was the 14th edition of the New York City Marathon and took place in New York City on 23 October.

Results

Men

Women

References

Suptil

New York City Marathon, 1983
Marathon
New York City Marathon
New York